Lopata is a settlement in the City Municipality of Celje in eastern Slovenia. It lies on the northwestern outskirts of Celje. The area is part of the traditional region of Styria. It is now included with the rest of the municipality in the Savinja Statistical Region.

Name
Like the village of Lopata in the Municipality of Žužemberk, the name of this village is derived from the common noun lopata (now 'shovel' but originally 'flat part/area'), referring to the level terrain of the village surrounded by hills.

References

External links
Lopata on Geopedia

Populated places in the City Municipality of Celje